Lokepara Mahavidyalaya, established in 2010, is an undergraduate general and honours degree college in village Lokpara, in Birbhum district. It offers undergraduate courses in arts. It is affiliated to  University of Burdwan.

Departments

Arts
 Bengali
History
Sanskrit

See also

References

External links
 http://www.lokeparamahavidyalaya.org

Colleges affiliated to University of Burdwan
Educational institutions established in 2010
Universities and colleges in Birbhum district
2010 establishments in West Bengal